Ki-Young Chung (Hangul: 정기영; born November 23, 1959) is a former professional boxer. During his career, which lasted from 1979 to 1986, Chung won the IBF world featherweight title. Before competing at featherweight, Choung won the Super Bantamweight title of South Korea  1982. He also won the Korean title as a featherweight, along with the OPBF title. His first challenge for a world title came on November 29, 1985 against fellow South Korean Min-Keun Oh. Chung won the fight with a technical knockout in the fifteenth round to become champion. He defended his title twice; knocking out Tyrone Jackson and beating Richard Savage with a unanimous decision. Chung lost his title to Antonio Rivera on August 30, 1986. Rivera won the fight with a tenth-round knockout, in what was to be Chung's final professional contest.

References

External links

Living people
Featherweight boxers
International Boxing Federation champions
1959 births
World featherweight boxing champions
South Korean male boxers
Sportspeople from North Gyeongsang Province